Jaromír Vlk (born 4 March 1949) is a Czech former athlete. He competed in the men's shot put at the 1972 Summer Olympics and the 1980 Summer Olympics.

References

External links
 

1949 births
Living people
Athletes (track and field) at the 1972 Summer Olympics
Athletes (track and field) at the 1980 Summer Olympics
Czech male shot putters
Olympic athletes of Czechoslovakia
People from Teplice nad Bečvou
Sportspeople from the Olomouc Region